Schismatorhynchos is an Asian genus of cyprinid freshwater fish found in India, Borneo and Sumatra.  There are four species in this genus, although some authorities raise Nukta to full generic status as a monotypic genus.

Species
 Schismatorhynchos endecarhapis Siebert & Tjakrawidjaja, 1998
 Schismatorhynchos heterorhynchos (Bleeker, 1854)
 Schismatorhynchos holorhynchos Siebert & Tjakrawidjaja, 1998
 Schismatorhynchos nukta (Sykes, 1839) (Nukta)

References
 

Cyprinidae genera
Cyprinid fish of Asia